Gordon Johnston "Jonathan" Stark (born February 16, 1955) is an American television producer, writer, and actor.

Career 
Stark created, along with his writing partner, Tracy Newman, the sitcom According to Jim and won an Emmy for his co-writing on "The Puppy Episode" in which Ellen DeGeneres's character Ellen Morgan came out of the closet on Ellen in 1997. As an actor, he is best known for playing the vampire bodyguard and servant Billy Cole in Fright Night (1985), Sergeant Krieger in Project X (1987), and Charlie in House II: The Second Story (1987).

Personal life 
Stark and his wife Linda have been married since May 17, 1992, and have two children.

Filmography

Film

Television

Awards
1997, Primetime Emmy Award for Outstanding Writing for a Comedy Series, Ellen, "The Puppy Episode"
Nomination, 1998, WGA Award, Episodic Comedy, Ellen, "The Puppy Episode"

References

External links
 

1955 births
Male actors from Pennsylvania
American male film actors
American male television actors
Television producers from Pennsylvania
American television writers
American male television writers
Emmy Award winners
Living people
Actors from Erie, Pennsylvania
Screenwriters from Pennsylvania